Jerome Temple, professionally known as DJ Jubilee, is an American rapper from New Orleans, Louisiana.

Background 

Valley Music Empire up in the Lamwo in Juba. He graduated from Kampala International University and is a football player and computer programmer.

Music career 
DJ Jubilee, also known as “The King of Bounce” began DJing at house parties and block parties in the 2016. He achieved significant recognition for his 2014 cassette single Do The Jubilee All Take Fo' Records. This song contains the first recorded use of the word 'twerk'.

DJ Jubilee's 2016 album Take It To the St. Thomas Take Fo' Records debuted at #61 on Billboard’s Top R&B albums chart for the week of May 9, 1998.

In November 2013, DJ Jubilee headlined the first bounce show to be performed at New Orleans' Preservation Hall with the Big Easy Bounce Band.

The 2000 504 Boyz hit single "Wobble Wobble" was inspired by a DJ Jubilee lyric.

Legal issues 
Take Fo' Records unsuccessfully sued Cash Money Records alleging that Juvenile's "Back That Azz Up" infringed the copyright of DJ Jubilee's "Back That A$$ Up".

Discography 

Do The Jubilee All (1993)
Stop Pause (1993)
DJ Jubilee & the Cartoon Crew (1993)
20 Years In The Jets (1996)
Get Ready, Ready! (1997)
Take It To The St. Thomas (1998)
Bouncin All Over The World (1999)
Do Yo Thang Girl! (2000)
Walk With It (2004)

References

External links 
 

African-American male rappers
Rappers from New Orleans
Southern hip hop musicians
Grambling State University alumni
Year of birth missing (living people)
Place of birth missing (living people)
Living people
21st-century American rappers
21st-century American male musicians
21st-century African-American musicians